New Jerusalem is a census-designated place in Rockland Township, Berks County, Pennsylvania, United States.  It is located in the South Mountains and is drained by the Manatawny Creek into the Schuylkill River. As of the 2010 census, the population was 649  residents.

Demographics

References

Census-designated places in Berks County, Pennsylvania
Census-designated places in Pennsylvania